Harrisville is an unincorporated community in Wayne Township, Randolph County, in the U.S. state of Indiana.

History
Harrisville was platted in 1854 by J. Harris, and named for him. A post office was established at Harrisville in 1854, and remained in operation until 1920.

Geography

References

Unincorporated communities in Randolph County, Indiana
Unincorporated communities in Indiana